Abhijit Bhaduri is an Indian author, columnist and management consultant. Bhaduri was Chief Learning Officer of the Wipro Group.
Bhaduri is the author of three best-selling books- two novels of the 'MBA' Series- Mediocre But Arrogant, Married but Available and the management 'guide-book' Don't Hire The Best.

Bhaduri's writings have appeared in journals and magazines including The Wall Street Journal, Harvard Business Review Ascend, The Hindu Business Line, Operations Research & Management Sciences Today. He is second among the top HR influencers on Social Media according to SHRM, India. He writes regularly for The Economic Times, People Matters and blogs for the Times of India.

Personal life 

Abhijit Bhaduri was raised in New Delhi. He completed his schooling from St. Xavier's School, Delhi. Bhaduri is a BA Honors (Economics) from Shri Ram College of Commerce of the Delhi University and a Post Graduate in Human Resources from the prestigious XLRI, Jamshedpur and an LLB from Delhi University, India.

An avid blogger, Bhaduri's blog posts appear under the Human Capital Exchange section of The Conference Board and for the Times of India. His website is listed in the Directory of Top Blogs in India and Most Widely Read Indian Bloggers. Bhaduri has illustrated several books and is an amateur cartoonist.

Bhaduri also made a brief appearance in the 2007 Bollywood film Apna Aasman starring Irrfan, Anupam Kher, Rajat Kapoor and Shobana. He has acted in plays staged in India, Kuala Lumpur and US.

Abhijit Bhaduri is married to Nandini. They have two children, Eshna and Abhishek.

Career 

Abhijit Bhaduri was the Chief Learning Officer for the Wipro group. He lives in Bangalore, India. Prior to this he has led HR teams at Microsoft, Pepsi, Colgate and Tata Steel and worked in India, South East Asia and US. Between 1989–94, Bhaduri taught HR at his alma-mater, XLRI, Jamshedpur.

Bhaduri is on the Advisory Board of the prestigious program for Chief Learning Officers that is run by the University of Pennsylvania.

Bhaduri's successful stint as the CLO of Wipro appeared as the cover story/page of the Chief Learning Officer Magazine (July 2013 edition).

His writings have appeared on HBR Ascend, The Wall Street Journal, The Economic Times, the Hindu Business Line, People Matters, Operations Research & Management Sciences Today. He has been quoted in Knowledge@Wharton and journals like Organizational Dynamics.

Bhaduri is a regular speaker. Among his prominent speeches are the ones at the Lift Conference in Geneva and at TEDx Gurgaon.

Books 

Bhaduri's first novel, Mediocre But Arrogant is a story about love and life in a Business School.

The book has featured in several best-seller lists – including The Hindu, NDTV.com just trailing Da Vinci Code, Crossword Book Store Chain Fiction Best-Sellers list according to the Deccan Herald.

Bhaduri's second novel in the MBA Series, Married But Available, published by Harper Collins, follows the life of the protagonist Abbey through the first ten years of his life as a Human Resources professional.

Both of these books are expansions of the acronym MBA.

His third book is a non-fiction book, Don't HireThe Best, published by Harper Collins India is a guide to picking the right team. The book explains why personality fit with the role and culture is the only way successful hiring can happen. Abhijit Bhaduri dwells into how a manager should pay heed to qualification, experience, competence and personality while recruiting and the secrets of good hiring. The book is seen as a practitioner's guide to better hiring. His advice on how to write a resume appears in Harvard Business Review Ascend.

His fourth book - The Digital Tsunami has been described by Forbes as, "The fun of the book, however, comes in 29 full-page sketches that Bhaduri injects along the way. Suddenly we're transported into a comic-book world in which adults are doing handstands, children are waving banners, and giant ice cream cones tower over tiny boats. Shoot me for reading the book this way, but each time I started a new chapter, I shamelessly jumped ahead to the next sketch before going back to read the text." Forbes referred to the visual appeal of the book when it described the 29 Sketchnotes as, "I've Seen Our Digital Future, In These 29 Zany Sketches."

In 2016, Abhijit Bhaduri wrote a chapter on Leadership Lessons from Feluda. The book was Feluda@50 edited by Boria Majumdar.

In 2017, Abhijit Bhaduri wrote an article on "Make Sure Your Resume Survives the Six-Seconds Test" on HBR Ascend.
His fifth book - Dreamers & Unicorns is a go-to book that explores the Before Corona (BC) scenario to advise on the After Disaster (AD) environment on future of work, workers and workplaces."

See also
 List of Indian writers

Notes

Reviews and further reading
 
  
  
 
 

Indian male novelists
Living people
English-language writers from India
Year of birth missing (living people)